Patricia Llaca is a Mexican actress who has participated both in films, soap operas and TV shows. She is also sometimes credited as Patricia De Llaca.

She is best known for her role as Andrea in the film La Habitación Azul.

Since 2005, Llaca has hosted the TV Show Animal Nocturno  alongside Mexican journalist Ricardo Rocha.

Filmography 
Casi divas (2008) .... Eva
Llamando a un Angel (2008)
Efectos Secundarios (2006) .... La Chule
Sexo, amor y otras perversiones (2006) .... Elena
"Una de balazos" (2005) (Video) .... Femme Fatale
Animal nocturno (2005) TV Series .... Host
Llamando a un Angel (2007) .... Eva Figueroa
Cero y van cuatro (2004) .... Julieta ("Vida Express")
Mirada de mujer: El regreso (2003) TV Series .... Verónica
Tú mataste a Tarantino (2003) 
La Habitación Azul (2002) .... Andrea
Fidel (2002) (TV) .... American Woman
Lo que es el amor (2001) TV Series .... Alex Palacios
Beat (2000) (as Patricia De Llaca) .... Mary
Alguien vio a Lola? (2000) 
Todo por amor (2000) TV Series .... Raquel
Ajos y cebollas (1999) 
Al borde (1998) .... Amanda
El Amor de mi vida (1998) TV Series .... Angela
Un baúl lleno de miedo (1997) .... Laura Toledo
La gente ya no escribe (1996)

Awards 
She was nominated to have acted on the "Sexiest Scene" for La Habitación Azul shared with her companion Juan Manuel Bernal.

References

External links

Living people
Mexican actresses
Year of birth missing (living people)